The 2011 FIA WTCC Race of Italy was the third round of the 2011 World Touring Car Championship season and the seventh running of the FIA WTCC Race of Italy. It was held on 15 May 2011 at the Autodromo Nazionale di Monza in Monza, Italy.

Both races were won by Robert Huff of Chevrolet RML. Kristian Poulsen claimed his maiden WTCC podium finish in race two when he finished third.

Background
After the previous round in Belgium, Huff was leading the drivers' championship by one point over Chevrolet team mate Alain Menu. Poulsen was leading the Yokohama Independents' Trophy.

Turkish driver Ibrahim Okyay returned to championship driving a Borusan Otomotiv Motorsport run naturally aspirated BMW 320si, having last competed in the 2008 season.

Report

Testing and free practice
Yvan Muller set the pace in Thursday's opening test session, beating the BMWs of Poulsen and Tom Coronel. SUNRED Engineering did not take part in the session having run their own private test the previous day.

Huff topped the opening free practice session on Saturday morning, a tenth quicker than the SEAT of Gabriele Tarquini. Franz Engstler ended up in the gravel trap at the parabolica during the session.

Muller led a Chevrolet 1–2–3–4 in the final free practice session, leading Huff, Menu and the independent Chevrolet Cruze of Darryl O'Young. Marchy Lee lost control of his DeTeam KK Motorsport BMW 320 TC at Lesmo and collided with the barriers, while Mehdi Bennani spun himself into the gravel at the same corner.

Qualifying
Huff continued his dominance of qualifying in 2011 to take his third pole position of the season, edging out team–mates Muller and Menu to lead a Chevrolet 1–2–3. Huff set his best lap in Q1 after the checkered flag fell, putting him ninth and into the second session. Tiago Monteiro was tenth in Q1 to take pole position for race two.

Muller set the pace at the start of Q2 but Huff went quickest on his first flying lap. Behind the Chevrolet trio, Michelisz lined up fourth alongside Menu on the second row as the leading independent driver. Monteiro, O'Young, Poulsen, Coronel, Bennani and Tarquini completed the top ten. Tarquini was taken to the medical centre for checks after the session when the left window in his car shattered.

Warm-Up
Warm–up took place on a damp track on Sunday morning, pole sitter Huff set the fastest time. Some drivers found the conditions tricky and took the first corner escape road, while Monteiro was called to the stewards' office for cutting a corner in sector three on his best lap.

Race One
Huff had led from pole position and was followed by Muller and Menu. A gap left by Muller towards the end of the first lap allowed Menu to take second place and the Swiss driver then set about catching the leader. Later on in the race, Muller was catching Menu and on the last lap the pair collided. Muller tagged Menu's car sending the second placed car into one of the barriers on the final lap. This left the last podium position open, Michelisz was running third but Monteiro got a better run through the last corner and by the line, Monteiro came out three–hundredths of a second ahead. Huff, Muller and Monteiro filled the podium places with Michelisz fourth as the winning independent and Coronel fifth. Yokohama Trophy leader Poulsen was sixth. The Lukoil-SUNRED pair of Tarquini and Aleksei Dudukalo were the only retirements.

Race Two
Monteiro started on the reversed grid pole but race one winner Huff passed him at the start to lead into the first corner. He was followed by Muller, who later bumped into the rear of Huff's car under braking for the Parabolica. The contact meant Huff got out of shape but stayed on track. Muller was shown the bad sportsmanship flag after the incident. Huff and Muller made it a Chevrolet 1–2 for both races and Poulsen took third and his first podium finish in the WTCC, Coronel had been in contention for the position until he slowed with a delaminated tyre. Monteiro ended up fourth and Menu was fifth having started the race from the back. Coronel ended the race fifteenth.

After the race, Muller was given a ten–place grid penalty, suspended for two rounds for causing the collision with Huff.

Results

Qualifying

Race 1

Bold denotes Fastest lap.

Race 2

Bold denotes Fastest lap.

Standings after the event

Drivers' Championship standings

Yokohama Independents' Trophy standings

Manufacturers' Championship standings

 Note: Only the top five positions are included for both sets of drivers' standings.

References

External links
World Touring Car Championship official website

Italy
FIA WTCC Race of Italy